Nicholas William Campofreda (January 14, 1914 – May 23, 1959) was an American football player.  He played professionally in the National Football League  (NFL) for the Washington Redskins in 1944.  Born in Baltimore, Maryland, he played college football at Western Maryland College–now known as McDaniel College.Nick was also a professional wrestler having wrestled Jack Dempsey several times. He also was on the first coaching staff of the Baltimore Colts of the AAFC in 1947. He later worked for WAAM (now WJZ-TV) in Baltimore hosting the TV WAAMboree a local variety show. He was the sportscaster for the local news in Baltimore for years and was also the play by play commentator for the Colts and Orioles games. He was the spokesperson for American Brewing in Baltimore and did several famous commercials for the local Brewery.

References

1914 births
1959 deaths
American football centers
American football tackles
McDaniel Green Terror football players
Washington Redskins players
Baltimore City College alumni
Players of American football from Baltimore